The 2023 ATP Finals (also known as the 2023 Nitto ATP Finals for sponsorship reasons) is a men's tennis tournament played on indoor hard courts at the Pala Alpitour in Turin, Italy, from 12 to 19 November 2023. It is the season-ending event for the highest-ranked singles players and doubles teams on the 2023 ATP Tour.

This is the 54th edition of the tournament (49th in doubles), and the third time Turin hosted the ATP Tour year-end championships.

Format 
The ATP Finals group stage has a round-robin format, with eight players/teams divided into two groups of four and each player/team in a group playing the other three in the group. The eight seeds were determined by the Pepperstone ATP rankings and ATP Doubles Team Rankings on the Monday after the last ATP Tour tournament of the calendar year. All singles matches, including the final, were best of three sets with tie-breaks in each set including the third. All doubles matches were two sets (no ad) and a Match Tie-break.

In deciding placement within a group, the following criteria were used, in order:

 Most wins.
 Most matches played (e.g., a 2–1 record beats a 2–0 record).
 Head-to-head result between tied players/teams.
 Highest percentage of sets won.
 Highest percentage of games won.
 ATP rank after the last ATP Tour tournament of the year.

Criteria 4–6 were used only in the event of a three-way tie; if one of these criteria decided a winner or loser among the three, the remaining two would have been ranked by head-to-head result.

The top two of each group advanced to semifinals, with the winner of each group playing the runner-up of the other group. The winners of the semifinals then played for the title.

Qualification

Singles 
Eight players compete at the tournament, with two named alternates. Players receive places in the following order of precedence:
 First, the top 7 players in the ATP Race to Turin on the Monday after the final tournament of the ATP Tour, that is after the Paris Masters.
 Second, up to two 2023 Grand Slam tournament winners ranked anywhere 8th–20th, in ranking order
 Third, the eighth ranked player in the ATP rankings
In the event of this totaling more than 8 players, those lower down in the selection order become the alternates. If further alternates are needed, these players are selected by the ATP.

Provisional rankings are published weekly as the ATP Race to Turin, coinciding with the 52-week rolling ATP rankings on the date of selection. Points are accumulated in Grand Slam, ATP Tour, United Cup, ATP Challenger Tour and ITF Tour tournaments. Players accrue points across 19 tournaments, usually made up of:
 The 4 Grand Slam tournaments
 The 8 mandatory ATP Masters 1000 tournaments
 The best results from any 7 other tournaments that carry ranking points (Monte-Carlo Masters, United Cup, ATP 500, ATP 250, Challenger, ITF)
 Player can replace up to 3 mandatory Masters 1000 results with a better score from ATP 500 or ATP 250

Doubles 
Eight teams compete at the tournament, with one named alternate. The eight competing teams receive places according to the same order of precedence as in singles. The named alternate will be offered first to any unaccepted teams in the selection order, then to the highest ranked unaccepted team, and then to a team selected by the ATP. Points are accumulated in the same competitions as for the singles tournament. However, for Doubles teams there are no commitment tournaments, so teams are ranked according to their 19 highest points scoring results from any tournaments on the ATP Tour.

Points breakdown

Singles 

Updated .

Notes

Doubles 

Updated .

See also 
 ATP rankings
 2023 ATP Tour
 2023 WTA Finals
 ATP Finals appearances

References

External links 
  
 ATP tournament profile

 
Finals
2023
2023 ATP Finals
Sports competitions in Turin
ATP Finals
ATP Finals